Francis Kingdon-Ward, born Francis Kingdon Ward OBE, (6 November 1885 in Manchester – 8 April 1958) was an English botanist, explorer, plant collector and author. He published most of his books as Frank Kingdon-Ward and this hyphenated form of his name stuck, becoming the surname of his wives and two daughters. It also became a pen name for his sister Winifred Mary Ward by default.

Biography

Son of Harry Marshall Ward and Selina Mary Ward, née Kingdon; he went on around 25 expeditions over a period of nearly fifty years, exploring Tibet, North Western China, Myanmar and Assam (in Northeastern India). In Myanmar he met and conducted some research into forestry and plants in the country with native botanist Chit Ko Ko.

Among his collections were the first viable seed of Meconopsis betonicifolia (Himalayan blue poppy, first discovered by Pére Delavay), Primula florindae  (giant cowslip, named after his first wife Florinda, née Norman-Thompson) and Rhododendron wardii, a yellow flowered species.

A species of lizard, Calotes kingdonwardi, is named in his honor. He is also commemorated in Ward's trogon, Harpactes wardi.

He survived many accidents on his expeditions including being impaled on a bamboo spike, falling off a cliff (stopped by a tree growing from the cliff), lost for two days with no food, tent crushed by a tree in a storm, and he was close to the epicentre of an earthquake (registering 9.6 on the Richter magnitude scale) on 15 August 1950 during an expedition in Assam.

In addition to his professional activities as a botanist, in the 1930s Kingdon-Ward also served as a spy for the British India Office. In 1935, Kingdon-Ward was arrested by Tibetans after he crossed the Sela pass into the Tawang tract ( now Tawang District of Arunachal Pradesh, India) despite being refused permission to do so by the Tibetan authorities who were then administering Tawang.  Tibetans protested this violation of their border to the British mission then visiting Lhasa. Kingdon-Ward was quickly released, but this incident led the British to investigate the status of the border, and it was discovered that the entire Tawang tract had been ceded to British India by Tibet by the Simla Convention negotiated by Sir Henry McMahon with the Tibetans in 1914.

In 1923 he moved to Hatton Gore, a big house on the east side of Hatton Road, Hatton, London; the site of the house is now under the east end of London Heathrow Airport. He built there a big rockery looking like a bend in a river ravine in the Himalayas. He sold the house due to a loss that he made running a plant nursery business.

He was married twice, first to Florinda Norman-Thompson on 11 April 1923; later, to Jean Macklin, on 12 November 1947, to whom he remained married until his death.

Florinda Kingdon-Ward had a brief political career which included standing as a Liberal Party candidate for Parliament at the 1950 UK General Election in Lewes.

Even towards the end of his career he was still active, his greatest "swansong" plant was probably Lilium mackliniae, found jointly with his second wife after whom it is named. At age 68 he climbed to over 1,730–2,590 metres (5,680–8,500 ft) above sea level in the Ukhrul district of Manipur, India (near the boundary of Myanmar to the east) and was still discovering new species of plants on his last expedition in 1956, including Roscoea australis, the most southerly representative of its genus.

He was made an Officer of the Order of the British Empire in 1952.

Frank Kingdon-Ward died on 8 April 1958 aged 72. He had suffered a stroke and went into a coma from which he never recovered. He was buried in the churchyard at Grantchester.

Published works
He wrote 25 books, mostly accounts of his expeditions. The titles, dates and publishers are as follows:
On the Road to Tibet (1910) Shanghai Mercury Ltd. Shanghai
Land of the Blue Poppy (1913) Cambridge University Press
In Farthest Burma (1921) Seeley Service and Co (reprinted by Orchid Press, Thailand; 2nd rev edition (Jan 2005) )
Mystery Rivers of Tibet (1923) Seeley Service and Co (reprinted by Cadogan Books, 1986 )
From China to Hkamti Long (1924) Edward Arnold and Co
The Romance of Plant Hunting (1924) Edward Arnold and Co
Riddle of the Tsangpo Gorges (1926) Edward Arnold and Co
Rhododendrons for Everyone (1926) The Gardener's Chronicle Ltd
Plant Hunting on the Edge of the World (1930) Victor Gollancz (reprinted 1974, Theophrastus)
Plant Hunting in the Wilds (1931) Figurehead (Pioneer series)
The Loom of the East (1932) Martin Hopkinson Ltd
A Plant Hunter in Tibet (1934) Jonathan Cape (reprinted by White Orchid, Thailand (2006) )
The Romance of Gardening (1935) Jonathan Cape
Plant Hunter's Paradise (1937) Jonathan Cape
Assam Adventure (1941) Jonathan Cape
Modern Exploration (1945) Jonathan Cape
About This Earth (1946) Jonathan Cape
Commonsense Rock Gardening (1948) Jonathan Cape
Burma's Icy Mountains (1949) Jonathan Cape (reprinted by White Orchid, Thailand; 2nd edition (2006) )
Rhododendrons (1949) Latimer House
Footsteps in Civilization (1950) Jonathan Cape
Plant Hunter in Manipur (1952) Jonathan Cape
Berried Treasure (1954) Ward Lock and Co. Ltd. London and Melbourne
Return to the Irrawaddy (1956) Andrew Melrose
Pilgrimage for Plants (1960) George C. Harrap and Co. Ltd

Famous relatives
His sister, Winifred Mary Ward, was a founder of the Royal College of Speech and Language Therapists and wrote several books on speech therapy.

Notes

References

Sources
 Frank Kingdon-Ward's own works, as listed above
 Frank Kingdon-Ward – Last of the Great Plant Hunters, Charles Lyte (1989), John Murray Publishers Ltd, 
 Frank Kingdon-Ward, timeline of events. 1885–1958

External links
Biography of Frank Kingdon-Ward, french4tots.co.uk
Oliver Tooley, Francis (Frank) Kingdon-Ward (1885-1958) Brief biography with much useful material not covered here
Forgotten Travellers: In the Land of the Blue Poppy Essay on F. Kingdon Ward
In the Footsteps of Kingdon Ward: photos of the Salween river, Tibet
Timeline of Frank Kingdon-Ward's life

1885 births
1958 deaths
People educated at St Paul's School, London
Alumni of Christ's College, Cambridge
Writers from Manchester
British Indian Army officers
Veitch Memorial Medal recipients
Officers of the Order of the British Empire
English botanists
English explorers
Plant collectors
English writers
Liberal Party (UK) parliamentary candidates